is a former Japanese football player.

Playing career
Kawaguchi was born in Kashiwa on January 24, 1967. After graduating from Rakuno Gakuen University, he joined Efini Sapporo. In 1993, he moved to Sanfrecce Hiroshima. However he did not play in any matches. In 1995, he moved to Nagoya Grampus Eight. Although he played in two matches, he cdid not play in many more, as he was second to Yuji Ito. In 1996, he moved to Japan Football League to Fukushima FC. Although he played many matches, the club was disbanded at the end of the 1997 season due to financial strain and he retired.

Club statistics

References

External links

1967 births
Living people
People from Kashiwa
Rakuno Gakuen University alumni
Association football people from Chiba Prefecture
Japanese footballers
J1 League players
Japan Football League (1992–1998) players
Sanfrecce Hiroshima players
Nagoya Grampus players
Fukushima FC players
Association football goalkeepers